Hütten is a former municipality in the district of Horgen in the canton of Zürich in Switzerland. On 1 January 2019 the former municipalities of Hütten and Schönenberg merged into the municipality of Wädenswil.

History
Hütten is first mentioned in 1270 as ze dien Hütten.

Geography

Of this area, 52.9% is used for agricultural purposes, while 36.7% is forested. Of the rest of the land, 5.5% is settled (buildings or roads) and the remainder (4.8%) is non-productive (rivers, glaciers or mountains).   housing and buildings made up 2.8% of the total area, while transportation infrastructure made up the rest (2.8%). Of the total unproductive area, water (streams and lakes) made up 2.8% of the area.   1.8% of the total municipal area was undergoing some type of construction.

The municipality is near the Hüttnersee, a small lake shared with Richterswil.  It is a linear village (Strassendorf) made up of hamlets and farm houses along both sides of the Sihl.

Demographics
, 6.5% of the population was made up of foreign nationals.   the gender distribution of the population was 52.9% male and 47.1% female. Over the last 10 years the population has grown at a rate of 7.4%. Most of the population speaks German  (93.1%), with English being second most common ( 1.5%) and Albanian being third ( 1.3%).

In the 2007 election the most popular party was the SVP which received 55.7% of the vote.  The next three most popular parties were the CSP (11%), the SPS (9.6%) and the CVP (7.3%).

The age distribution of the population is children and teenagers (0–19 years old) make up 29.5% of the population, while adults (20–64 years old) make up 56.9% and seniors (over 64 years old) make up 13.6%.  The entire Swiss population is generally well educated.  In Hütten about 71% of the population (between age 25-64) have completed either non-mandatory upper secondary education or additional higher education (either university or a Fachhochschule).  There are 327 households in Hütten.

Hütten has an unemployment rate of 2.11%.  , there were 93 people employed in the primary economic sector and about 35 businesses involved in this sector.  31 people are employed in the secondary sector and there are 11 businesses in this sector.  101 people are employed in the tertiary sector, with 24 businesses in this sector.   38% of the working population were employed full-time, and 62% were employed part-time.

 there were 359 Catholics and 413 Protestants in Hütten. In the 2000 census, religion was broken down into several smaller categories. Of the rest of the population, 0% were Muslim, 2.8% belonged to another religion (not listed), 4.9% did not give a religion, and 5.9% were atheist or agnostic.

The historical population is given in the following table:

Transportation 
The Zimmerberg bus line (Zimmerbergbus), provided by the Sihltal Zürich Uetliberg Bahn (SZU), connects the Zimmerberg region and parts of the Sihl valley.

References

External links

  
 

Former municipalities of the canton of Zürich